Kebena is a district, also called woreda, in Ethiopia. The district is named after the Kebena people and was part of the former Goro Woreda, which is a part of the Gurage Zone. Kebena is bordered to the south by the Wabe River, which separates this district from Kokir Gedebano, Muhor Na Aklil, Ezha and Cheha. Kebena is bordered to the west by Abeshge and to the north by the Oromia Region. The town of Welkite is surrounded by Kebena and was part of the Islamic Sultanate of Hadiya. 

Kebena is known for its religious wars, which were fought in a bloody battle at Jebdo against the Emperor Menelik II of Ethiopia, led by their leader, Hasan Enjamo. Hasan Enjamo revived the Islam and Islamic sultanate after they fell under the control of the Christian Emperor. He was credited for maintaining the Islamic faith in the southern region of Ethiopia. His cause of death was registered as fatigue while riding his horse.

Demographics 
According to the 2008 Census conducted by the CSA, WOREDA had a total population of 52,379 people, of which 26,231 were men and 26,148 were women; none of the population were urban inhabitants. The majority of the inhabitants identified themselves as Muslim, with 89.52% of the population reporting that belief, while 8.22% practiced Ethiopian Orthodox Christianity, and 1.91% were Protestants.

References

External links
Official website of Kebana people

 Districts of the Southern Nations, Nationalities, and Peoples' Region